Mulata National Forest is a national forest in the state of Pará, Brazil.

Location

It is almost equally divided between the municipalities of Alenquer (49.7%) and Monte Alegre (50.3%) in the state of Pará.
It adjoins the Trombetas State Forest to the west and the Paru State Forest to the north.
It lies in the north of the Amazon depression in the marginal plateau of the Amazon River.
It is drained by the Maicuru, Curuá and Cuminapanema rivers.

The Mulata National Forest is in the Amazon biome.
Coverage is 53% dense rainforest, 5% open rainforest, and 41% savannah-forest contact.
The savannah is in the south.

Conservation

The Mulata National Forest was created on 1 August 2001 and is administered by the Chico Mendes Institute for Biodiversity Conservation (ICMBio).
The occupants of the settlement areas created by the Instituto Nacional de Colonização e Reforma Agrária in 1965 were to receive compensation for their land.
The advisory council was created on 30 March 2011.
It is classed as IUCN protected area category VI (protected area with sustainable use of natural resources) with the objective of sustainable multiple use of forest resources and scientific research, with emphasis on methods for sustainable exploitation of native forests.
Protected species include the Amazonian manatee (Trichechus inunguis).

They destroyed the trees and a tractor found in the forest.

Notes

Sources

National forests of Brazil
2001 establishments in Brazil
Protected areas of Pará